St. Peter's Roman Catholic Church in Harpers Ferry, West Virginia occupies a prominent location on the heights above Harpers Ferry.  The original church was built in 1833 in a pseudo-Gothic style which it kept through the Civil War, the only church in Harpers Ferry to escape destruction during the war.  The church was extensively altered in 1896 in the then-popular Neo-Gothic style to produce the church seen today.  The church commands a sweeping vista across the gorge of the Shenandoah River above its confluence with the Potomac River. The street along the side of the church building is part of the Appalachian Trail. A short trail leads from the church to Jefferson Rock. St. Peter's Church is a mission church of St. James in Charles Town. A Mass is offered at the historic church Sunday at 9:30 a.m.

History
The 1831 church was dedicated in 1833, to some extent resembling reduced St. Mary's Seminary Chapel in Baltimore, Maryland as an early Gothic Revival church. The 1896 remodeling by architects Thomas J. Collins and Son  was extensive in scope, completely changing the church into a stone-clad Victorian Gothic structure, resembling the architects' St. Francis Roman Catholic Church in Staunton, Virginia.

Description
The rebuilt church is an elaborately detailed Victorian Gothic structure. The exterior is finished in gray stone with red sandstone trim. The tall spire stands at the edge of the cliff overlooking the Shenandoah River. The interior is a single, bright room. Aisles are suggested by suspended vaulting with gilded pendants. The lancet windows are mainly furnished with colored glass rather than figurative representations. The sanctuary is marked by a polygonal apse.

Gallery

See also
 National Register of Historic Places listings in Jefferson County, West Virginia
 Harpers Ferry National Historical Park
 Harpers Ferry Historic District

References

External links

Official website

Churches on the National Register of Historic Places in West Virginia
Buildings and structures in Harpers Ferry, West Virginia
Harpers Ferry, West Virginia
19th-century Roman Catholic church buildings in the United States
Roman Catholic churches completed in 1833
Gothic Revival church buildings in West Virginia
Churches in the Roman Catholic Diocese of Wheeling-Charleston
Tourist attractions in Jefferson County, West Virginia
National Register of Historic Places in Jefferson County, West Virginia